Pequea Valley High School is the only secondary school in the Pequea Valley School District. It is located in Kinzers, Lancaster County, Pennsylvania, United States.

Statistics
Attendance at Pequea Valley Senior High School during the 2005–2006 school year was 92.91%, compared with the 87.97% scored in the prior year. Students were 57.1% proficient in math and 73.4% proficient in reading.

In 2012, the school's varsity soccer team won the state title.

Pequea Valley uses a native American as its mascot.

References

Public high schools in Pennsylvania
Schools in Lancaster County, Pennsylvania